Necmettin Bilal Erdoğan (born 23 April 1981) is a Turkish businessman, the second child of Recep Tayyip Erdoğan, the President of Turkey.

Early life
Necmettin Bilal was born on 23 April 1981, the second child of Recep Tayyip Erdoğan and Emine Erdoğan. He has three siblings: Ahmet Burak, Sümeyye Erdoğan and Esra Erdoğan. After finishing secondary school at Kartal Anadolu İmam Hatip Lisesi in 1999, Erdoğan moved to the United States, and graduated from Indiana University Bloomington with a bachelor's degree in political science and economics. He then earned a master's degree from the John F. Kennedy School of Government at Harvard University in 2004.

Career
After graduation, he served at the World Bank as an intern for a while. He returned to Turkey in 2006 and started his business life. Erdoğan is one of the three equal shareholders of BMZ Group Denizcilik ve İnşaat Sanayi Anonym Şirketi, a marine transportation corporation. He is also on the governing board of the Turkish Youth Foundation which is exempt of paying taxes by decree of the Turkish president, Bilals father.

Personal life
Erdoğan married Reyyan Uzuner in 2003. The couple have two sons, Ömer Tayyip and Ali Tahir, and a daughter, Fatıma Serra.

In October 2015, Today's Zaman reported that Erdoğan and his family had moved to Bologna, Italy, after his father's AK Party lost its parliamentary majority in June. It is stated that he will finish his PhD at The Johns Hopkins University SAIS Bologna Center there, but that all he has to do is complete his thesis, which does not require his permanent presence in Bologna, but does enable him to obtain a two-year residence permit.

In February 2016 the prosecuting attorney of Bologna started a lawsuit for money laundering against him.

Corruption scandal

Erdoğan came under accusations of corruption during the 2013 corruption scandal in Turkey that extended to other top members of TÜRGEV, for which he gave testimony.

References

1981 births
Living people
Bilal
Turkish people of Georgian descent
Businesspeople from Istanbul
Recep Tayyip Erdoğan
Sons of national leaders
Turkish people of Arab descent
Indiana University Bloomington alumni
Harvard Kennedy School alumni